Together Boston is an annual electronic music and arts festival based in the Boston and Cambridge, Massachusetts area. It was first held in 2010. Through a week-long series of educational and professional discussions, demonstrations, installations, screenings and performances at venues around the Boston/Cambridge area, Together Boston attracts thousands of people every year, and has increased its attendance every year as a primary New England area music festival. Originally based in Boston proper, Together's office and primary venue locations lie across the Charles River in Central Square, Cambridge, Massachusetts, frequenting locations such as The Sinclair, The Middle East (nightclub)

2016

For its seventh year, the festival honed in on its more technological side. Three different installations were included at the Middlesex Lounge, including the incredible Lumen Octangula programmed by Theresa Silver. Downstair at the Middle East, meanwhile, featured an LED wall behind the stage for the first time. Other outstanding technologists participated all week long. Finally, the riveting and electric performance of the Floating Points live show at The Sinclair for the launch party was a perfect set-up for the week to come.

2015

The first-ever official Resident Advisor event was a highlight, featuring Mano LeTough and Bob Moses, while Andy Stott played the opening night party. Dirtybird Records' Justin Martin brought the house down, Sango visited to represent the Soulection movement, and the Middlesex Lounge in Cambridge was turned into a dark black box of flashing lights. While the number of events declined, the quality of the experience was heightened. Art installations like a human-sized Lite Brite and the world premiere of the Gif Dance Party left quite an impression on attendees.

2014

This year saw a number of special musical events including Bob Mould playing in Cambridge to celebrate the 10th anniversary of gay marriage, Chicago soul champions The Numero Group visiting Boston's legendary Soulelujah team and the debut of an experimental live lab in Inman Square's LilyPad featuring leading lights of Massachusetts' psychedelic rock community such as Major Stars, Sunburned Hand of the Man and internationally recognized sound designer Keith Fullerton Whitman. Other guests from 2014 included Detroit techno legend Robert Hood, Brooklyn's Mos Def, Germany's Tensnake and Norway's Cashmere Cat, most recently responsible for producing a single for Ariana Grande.

2013

In 2013, Together hosted internationally known musical artists such as Flying Lotus from Los Angeles, Four Tet from London, Crystal Castles and Grammy-nominee Duke Dumont, both from Toronto, Oscar-winner Juicy J with A$AP Ferg, Zomby and more.

2012-10

2012 highlights included now-popular television star Big Freedia, critically acclaimed noise producer (and one-time Massachusetts resident) Oneohtrix Point Never and Album of the Year Grammy-winner Todd Edwards. 2011 and 2010 both included a number of superstars, including SBTRKT, Nico Jaar, Spank Rock, Damian Lazarus and Trentemoller.

Mission

The festival's motto, "Music, Art, Technology," underlies its efforts to link new music with all aspects of modern and forward thinking culture via an intellectual slant. The festival seeks to provide more than just a week of music, educating attendees through daytime panels, art exhibitions, and film screenings.

Music

The music component also focuses on showcasing any number of local musicians from the Boston area (Horse Jumper of Love, André Obin, Blue Boy Productions, Guillermo Sexo, John Barera, Mean Creek, Ricardo Donoso), and pairing them up with international stars. In addition, the festival spotlights key visual artists and technologists from the city's burgeoning innovation and art community: past artists have included First Night honoree Zebbler, Brian Kane (formerly of Emergency Broadcast Network) and Beyoncé-video director Julian Wadsworth. 2013 film screenings included Style Wars and We Are Modeselektor at the Museum of Fine Arts, Boston. In 2014 they screened I Dream of Wires, a documentary about the modular synthesizer at the Institute of Contemporary Art, Boston.

Acclaim

Together Boston has been gathering acclaim since its inception. In its first year, Metro Boston reported that "reaction is positive from the community and business groups involved." In 2011, the Boston Globe reported that "with an increased focus on a slate of daytime panels, discussions, and technology demonstrations, the organizers want to engender a dialogue about music." 2012 saw Red Bull Music Academy documentation with future Best Album Grammy-winner Todd Edwards and Chicago Juke legend DJ Rashad., while music website Earmilk said: "Together creates a nightlife with smart undertones for people to gather around to try to find something a bit more transcendent, surrounded by cool, interesting people."

In 2013, Together received a lengthy, well-written review from tastemaking music magazine XLR8R: "Together remains a festival by Bostonians for Bostonians, a fitting labor of love for a city in need of as much love as it can get." And also from the Boston Globe: "This year’s programming further emphasizes the art and technology aspects of Together’s larger mission." The following year, the Globe said: "The focus of the week is not just music, but also the art and technology that makes Boston such a thriving, creative place to live at the moment." The same year, Fact Magazine said "Together Boston is rapidly positioning itself as one of the United States’ best events for forward-thinking music."

In 2014, new Boston Mayor Marty Walsh chimed in on the festival, before dropping the ceremonial "first beat." "Lineups like these garner national and international attention," the Mayor said, "which helps us strengthen Boston's reputation as a cultural destination." And the reputable international music magazine Resident Advisor gave the festival a 4.5 out of 5 star review in 2014. "Together showed what a dedicated community can accomplish even with factors like that stacked against it, and it made the city seem vibrant, fun, and hungry for good music."

In November 2014, Together Boston was awarded "Best Festival" in Boston by The Boston Calendar. The Boston Calendar organizers called the event "ahead of its time."

Thump, Vice Magazine's dance music channel, reviewed the festival at its sixth iteration. "The sixth edition of Together ... was a reminder of how much Boston still has to offer for the tribes of dance music fans who live here." And: "Despite its size, Together pulled off an impressive range of sounds from across the electronic spectrum."

Resident Advisor again visited to review the event. "With consistent sound, good crowds, solid venues, and a great lineup, I still can't quite narrow down exactly what made Together 2015 feel as great as it did. Maybe it's just a matter of getting all the little things right."

Previewing the festival, Resident Advisor called Together 2016 a global destination in their "Top 10 Music Festivals" feature.

In 2016, The Boston Globe nailed it. of the super-event: "The core notion of the festival ... isn’t just to provide a good time, but to illustrate the fertile mix of art and technology intrinsic to current-day Boston, a city that celebrates its visual artists and musicians even as it cultivates a fresh identity as a hub for technological advancement."

After that year, Resident Advisor said: "The festival's seventh year was its best yet, primarily through refinement: rather than growing larger and more sprawling, Together has narrowed its focus. Every day of the week there was at least one—and often several—things to look forward to."

Musical Performances

Together has held events at most Boston/Cambridge, MA area venues, such as The Sinclair, The Middle East, House of Blues Boston, Royale, Paradise, Great Scott, Middlesex Lounge, Goodlife, Phoenix Landing and more. As a festival that focuses on hosting "showcase" style events over the course of a week, some of the following artists appeared together for label showcases, or as a part of a typical club night roster.

Notable musical artists who have worked with Together Boston include:

2017

 Adesse Versions
 Alessandro Cortini
 Avalon Emerson
 Beautiful Swimmers
 Ben UFO
 Clark
 Com Truise
 CreateSpace Collab
 Dâm-Funk
 Dee Diggs
 Detroit Swindle
 Elements
 DJ Bugalú
 Gary Carlow
 Jacques Greene
 Jamie O'Sullivan
 Kerri Chandler
 Kim Ann Foxman
 Leon Vynehall
 LSDXOXO
 Magda
 Matrixxman
 Mike Servito
 Mr. Mitch
 Mumdance
 Octo Octa
 Om Unit
 Pangaea
 Pantha du Prince
 Pearson Sound
 Princess Nokia
 Proximia
 Ricardo Donoso
 Sappho
 Simian Mobile Disco
 Solar
 Soul Clap
 Star Eyes
 UMFANG

2016

 Ben UFO
 Bicep
 The Black Madonna
 Axel Boman
 Fatima Yamaha
 Floating Points
 Giraffage
 Miss Honey Dijon
 J. Phlip
 Juju & Jordash
 Kink
 Matthew Dear
 Optimo
 Palms Trax
 Henrik Schwarz

2015

 Andy Stott
 Ardalan
 Bob Moses
 Breakbeat Lou
 DJ Three
 DVS1
 Gina Turner
 Justin Martin
 Laidback Luke
 Life on Planets
 Mano Le Tough
 Martyn
 Sasha
 Scuba
 Soul Clap
 Total Science

2014

 Bob Mould (DJ Set)
 Cashmere Cat
 Chet Faker
 Daniel Avery
 The Gaslamp Killer
 Julio Bashmore
 Keith Fullerton Whitman
 Natasha Kmeto
 Noisia
 The Numero Group
 Robert Hood
 Sophie
 Tensnake
 Untold
 Yassin Bey (Mos Def)

2013
 !!!
 Agoria
 A$AP Ferg
 Art Department
 Biz Markie
 Black Marble
 Blue Boy Productions
 Chief Boima
 Chez Damier
 Crystal Castles
 Dam Swindle (formerly Detroit Swindle)
 Flying Lotus
 Fred Falke
 Four Tet
 Gold Panda
 Jack Sparrow (DJ)
 Jeff Bujak
 Juicy J
 Kool Moe Dee
 Le1f
 Lespecial
 LIFELIKE
 Loudpvck
 Mathew Jonson
 Mike Swells
 Objekt
 Pictureplane
 Soul Clap
 Teebs
 Thundercat
 Tiga
 Toy Selectah
 Voices of Black
 Wilkinson
 Zombie Nation

2012

 Big Freedia
 Break Science
 Dillon Francis
 Dubfire
 FaltyDL
 Fenster
 Gramatik
 Kyle Hall
 Phill Niblock
 RJD2
 Treasure Fingers
 6th Borough Project
 Mala
 Armanni Reign
 Nero
 Oneohtrix Point Never
 Photek
 Poirier
 Starkey
 Teebs
 Todd Edwards
 Voices of Black

2011

 Trentemøller (Live)
 Wolfgang Gartner
 Pantha Du Prince
 Switch
 Mary Anne Hobbs
 Ninja Tune
 Mogwai
 Harvard Bass
 SBTRKT
 Mr. C
 Ramadanman
 Zed Bias
 Goth-Trad
 DJ Dara
 Egyptrixx
 xi
 Anton Pieete
 Maya Jane Coles
 Future Rock
 Hot Pink Delorean
 Steve Porter
 Spectrum

2010

 Damian Lazarus
 Das Racist
 Machinedrum
 Justin Martin
 Nico Jaar
 Neon Indian
 Phantogram
 Sinden
 Spank Rock

Daytime Events

Discussions/Panels/Lectures

For the first time in the festival history, Together Boston, launched an app which helped to guide festival attendees all week long. Meetups for 2016 commenced with a discussion on, again in partnership with the Dutch Government. Tech huddles commented all week as well, again at the tech hub named Danger!Awesome. The talent behind the VJ Competition held a free tutorial on Ableton and VJing. The record fair was once again a success, this time welcoming a guest host in accomplished producer Martyn.

2015 Seminar highlights included visiting author Michaelangelo Matos discussing his book The Underground is Massive, an "RA Exchange" podcast with Martyn, and an official Ableton session with Ellie Herring. The Cambridge-based makerspace Danger Awesome held its own concurring events, like the Cryptoparty with the Massachusetts Pirate Party and a music hackathon. There was also a unique international component as the festival hosted a large number of Dutch guests from Utrecht. The end result was an official proclamation from the Boston's Mayor Marty Walsh honoring the contributions the Dutch have made to international culture.

2014 the daytime events transformed into two locations: The Mmmmaven Project educational program in Central Square and District Hall, Boston's brand-new home of innovation in Boston's Seaport District. The Recharge Lounge featured Integrating live performance in Ableton and demonstrations of creative collaboration with ToUch Performance Art. Meanwhile, District Hall held the "Ableton Spaces," which included demonstrations of Ableton's popular push controller, vocal processing with Natasha Kmeto and How to Make Music with Plants featuring Data Garden from Philadelphia.

Also at District Hall were the "Together Talks" featuring four themed days of discussion. Day 1, "Community Day" featured Boston Mayor Marty Walsh "dropping the ceremonial first beat" and a discussion with Boston-raised superstars Soul Clap. Friday was Technology Day which featured VSnap, Cadenza and Groupmuse. Saturday then became "Music Day" with presentations from Harvard University, MassArt and famed "technomusicologist" Wayne Marshall. Finally, art had its place on Sunday May 18 with multiple presentations from Massachusetts Institute of Technology and a segment on augmented wearable fashions from the Rhode Island School of Design

2013's panels included a discussion on artist representation in the digital age with Josh Bhatti of Bowery Boston, Carter Adams of the Windish Agency and Michael Walsh of XLR8R, a panel on copyright law in the modern era moderate by Andy Sellars of Harvard University's Berkman Center for Internet & Society and a Q&A with meme celebrity Scumbag Steve.

Demonstrations from 2012 included a Drum Production workshop hosted by iZotope, and a panel called "Needles vs Buttons," discussing the differences between vinyl DJing and Digital Djing. As well as more general music and creative industry panels such as "Beyond Ramen: Surviving as an Artist" and "War Stories from the Start-Up Front".

Film Screenings

Together Festival also focuses on screening films that relate to music and aspects of new music cultures throughout the week of each festival. The screenings typically take place at Boston and Cambridge, MA's independently owned cinemas, though screenings have taken place at the area's largest cinema, Boston Common Lowes 19. A few of the films, focusing on German artists, were screened at Boston's Goethe Institute.

Previous years film selections included:

 Take One
 Don't Think
 The Electric Daisy Carnival Experience
 Speaking in Code
 Berlin Calling
 Villalobos
 Style Wars
 We Are Modeselektor
 I Dream of Wires

Get Together

Every year, the festival hosts a daytime farmers market-style trade show where local enthusiasts and music products retailers display and sell many different products relating to music culture. In previous years, music products retailers Music Studio Direct as well as representatives from a number of software developers such as Ableton have had booths side by side with a wide array of local vendors. It is particularly popular for its wide assortment of second hand dance music vinyl records sold and traded by local DJs throughout the day.

In 2013, Get Together moved outdoors to the become the World's Fair. The event featured live music, DJ stages and food from local restaurants and food trucks as well as the traditional trade show.

2014 saw the debut of the Soul Clap Record Fair, a tradition that has turned into a seasonal event in Cambridge, MA. The record fair continues to this day.

Competitions

For the first three years, Together ran an amateur remix, DJ and VJ competition, open to all USA residents which, in 2013, awarded prizes including festival passes, an opening slot for Tiga, courses at the MMMMaven DJ school and a wide assortment of production software and software plug-ins. Production competitions in recent years have allowed entrants to remix Boston-based artists Bad Rabbits, Win Win, Tiga and Cambridge's own Soul Clap, who have become one of the world's most prominent DJ and Production groups.

Annual Compilations

Together releases an official free annual compilation of tracks composed, mixed, and mastered by Boston-based musicians, including both individual tracks and a master mix of all tracks. 
 

2017

 GMGN - In The Sun
 Dusty Digital - Disco Pump 5000
 Coralcola - Wind Tiki
 Colin Domigan - Hoverboard Kickflip
 Deezy & Embee - Hoia-Baciu
 Foli Jackson - Laughing Track
 Hot Pot - Chemicals (feat. KR the MC)
 Steve Darko - The Lowdown
 Subalias - Point Blank
 Antonious Monk - Crab Nebula
 Cross Chatter - Midnight Pass
 Moduloktopus - Shampanskoye
 Psylab - Jupiter in Aries
 Siouxside - Listen
 American Dave - Burnout
 Gys - Deg Mode
 Hash Collision - Ground Fault
 Loonball - El Sid
 Nick Minieri - Together Compilation 2017 Mix

2016
 Saucy Lady - Bitches All Sound The Same 
 Dumka - Grim
 Camino 84 - Barely Broken
 Basek - Night And Day
 Antonious Monk - Green Planet
 Colin Domigan - RaveTech 9000
 Fuzzy Fotch - Bad Boy
 Hot Pot - Hug Dealer
 Odd Job - Throwya
 Omdose - Nuwoseo Tteok Muggi
 TWISM, B3RAO & Groove N Soul - Ibiza Life
 Peter Corvaia - Track 'Em
 Jack Novin - The Warmest
 Jonathan Santarelli - Vibe
 GMGN - Get Stoopid
 L'Homie & FlyLosophy - Red Mantis
 Andski - 617
 Bamboora - Good Times
 DERIC - Don't Stop

2015
 ø˚(Alt-OK) - Revol
 Camino - You My Love
 GMGN - In The Fields
 John Barera & Bob Diesel - No Fly List
 Peter Corvaia - Due Time
 Twism & B3RAO - Detroit
 Dusty Digital - Acid Will Set You Free
 Knowlton Walsh - Jaded
 Mr. Marimba - Two 
 Pat Fontes - Hudson House Pizza
 TECHNCN - Turning Point
 Adam Noya - Back Up
 Dumka - Motif
 Fuzzy Fotch - Yo Cut
 Moduloktopus - All That Ever Mattered Was How Well You Lived The Present Moment
 Tone Ra & Jon Pon (d) Scum - Prophets
 Vaepors - 911 Emergency
 Antonious Mong - Titanium Girlscout
 KiA MAZZi: The City On The Hill
 Noms X CHLO - Kuma Hugz
 Nu.F.O - Rise up
 ShaR4 - Bring Us Together

2014

In 2014, Together Boston partnered with Boston label Zakim Recordings to produce a vinyl edition of the compilation, with 6 of the tracks featured on a special-edition 12" release. All six could be found on the Zakim Bandcamp page, the rest were released digitally via SoundCloud. Those on the special Zakim edition are indicated by a *.

 Adam Noya - It's All A Hologram
 Doctor Jeep - Together
 John Barera/Baltimoroder - Walled City
 John Barera/Ali Berger - Off the Clock
 Smeed & Suspense - Handle It
 Undrig - Backslider *
 Cirrus - Almost There
 Coralcola - Moping Mechanism
 Living Light (Eartha Harris) - Hidden Mission
 Shar4 & Kid Optimus - Would You Be
 n0ms - Westcoast to Coast
 Colin Domigan - Strap Up
 Fuzzy Fotch - Dub Chi *
 Eric Rigo - Dreams
 Chadley - Unfortunate Truth
 Pat Fontes - Suburban Shake
 Moduloktopus - Bottom Pushah *
 TBMA - Obsessed (Voltran Remix)
 Monktec - Kenmore
 Tone Ra - Tell Me If There's An Iceberg *
 Amaranth - Davis Square
 Skullyman - Staying Ground *
 Choppa Dunks & Prince Fox - Money On My Mind
 Wubson - Hentai
 EHT - Amethyst
 Nick Garcia - Visions
 Timmy Trax & BRRIO - Lookin' 4
 G Notorious - 787
 Micetro - Brunch Muzik *
 Tide Eye - Sweat
 Dusty Digital - Nightdrift
 XzakLee - Saxohornz
 GMGN - Pieces
 Virek & Surgio - Spare Me
 Dark & Stormy - My Body
 Blunt Sinatras - Subba Rankz

2013

 Tone Ra - There It Is
 AxH - Take a Number Baby
 Holm - May Whatever You Believe In Be With You these Days
 Space Oreo - Vindaloo
 Bass Glutton - Hit Da Flo!
 Ceoux - There Are Birds Outside
 Victor Radz - Make a Living
 Noms - Egypt
 Chadley - Slowsey Downsey
 Cirrus - Foxhound
 Doctor Jeep - Devil Rhythm
 SBJCT #3 - Summ-R
 Fuzzy Fotch - Rinse Out
 Gonja - Persian Passover (ft. Wallace Liberachi)
 Victims of Modern Art - Small Apartment Windows
 Hasaan Barclay - Turismo
 Ali Berger - Laser Beam
 Secret School - ICA Step
 M.O.O.N. - Case Logic
 Tide Eye - Falling
 Visual Transitions - Bourne (Sagamore)

2012

In 2012, the compilation was also made available through download cards sponsored in part by FizzKicks.

 Prism - Iconic Soul 6:00
 Chadley - The Love 6:40
 Fifty Grand - I Have Never Been Afraid 6:00
 AxH - My Baby Bad 4:39
 Valor - Warehouse Rave 6:55
 Doctor Jeep - Preciso 5:55
 P.Dumsk - Take A Penny 2:20
 J-Hilla - Fuse 6:31
 Quam - Coordinate 5:40
 M.O.O.N - Delay 8:17
 Sergio Paramo - Chicago (Festival Mix) 6:02
 DJ Melee & Shuman - Vulpine 6:44
 Rewrote - Gravel 2:29
 Brent Still Life - Taken From You 5:02
 Glass Teeth - Hurt Me 2:40
 L.A.D.S - Get You Off My Mind 6:30
 Figgy - I Can't Help 3:46
 DeQualia - Rescue When Beautiful 7:27

2011

2011 was the first year the festival utilized a Soundcloud.

 Coracola (ft. Andre Obin) - Little Doll
 Dev Null - Bithowl
 Dabu - Ghetto Ballerinas
 Brothers - Faded Signal
 Red Foxx - I WANT 2 B FREE
 Ming Ming - Drawer of Bitches
 Doctor Jeep - Yr Mind (Elkid Mzungu remix)
 Christopher Wade - Miss Vicarious Sunset
 Steppo - Gassed
 Kat Fyte - Grab It
 DJ Vous - Doin My Thang
 DJ Die Young - Cambridge Bells
 Grizzly - Dance With Me
 Black Adonis - So Fine
 The Statesmen - 19 Drops

2010

In the first year of Together, the 8-song compilation came courtesy of CDRs provided by Discmakers.

 Sect - Searching for Santos
 Binmaker - Pep Pep
 Bodega Girls - Ain't That Cold
 Sluttt - Kiss Infinity
 Encanti - Dub Fish
 Christopher Wade - Falling In
 Coracola - Egggirl
 Chris Ward - Don't Know

References

External links

Festivals in Boston
Music festivals in Massachusetts